"Tequila Sunrise" is a song from 1973, written by Don Henley and Glenn Frey, and recorded by the Eagles. It was the first single from the band's second album, Desperado. It peaked at number 64 on the Billboard Hot 100.

A cover version was recorded by country music singer Alan Jackson on the 1993 tribute album Common Thread: The Songs of the Eagles. It reached number 64 on the Billboard Hot Country Singles & Tracks chart.

Background
Glenn Frey and Don Henley did not write songs together for their debut album, Eagles and, after they had finished recording the album in London, they decided that they should collaborate. In the first week of their partnership, they wrote "Tequila Sunrise" and "Desperado".  According to Frey, the song was finished fairly quickly. He said he was lying on a couch playing the guitar, and came up with a guitar riff he described as "kinda Roy Orbison, kinda Mexican". He demonstrated it for Henley and said: "Maybe we should write something to this." The title refers to a cocktail named Tequila Sunrise that was then popular. In the liner notes of 2003's The Very Best Of, Henley had this to say about the song:

According to Billboard, the theme of the song is " one man's efforts at survival and having to take 'a shot of courage.'"  Cash Box called it "a magnificent medium tempo tune certain to become a classic" that is "highlighted by some excellent vocal harmonies."

Henley said that Frey came up with changes for the bridge, and that "take another shot of courage" refers to tequila being known as "instant courage." He said: "We very much wanted to talk to the ladies, but we often didn’t have the nerve, so we’d drink a couple of shots and suddenly it was, "Howdy, ma’am.""

There is a live version of this song (Live ABC 1973) in which Glenn Frey sings additional lyrics:

There is no information to confirm if this was impromptu, or if these are original lyrics they decided to leave off the original record.

Another live version (Live Popgala’73) (Voorburg 1973, De Vliegermolen, The Netherlands March 9th,1973, Popgala’73 VARA Television and Radio) also includes additional lyrics very similar:

Ultimate Classic Rock critic Sterling Whitaker rated it as the Eagles 7th most underrated song, praising Bernie Leadon's guitar and mandolin playing and Frey's vocal performance.

Personnel
 Glenn Frey – lead vocals, acoustic guitar
 Don Henley – drums, maracas, backing vocals
 Randy Meisner – bass, backing vocals
 Bernie Leadon – B-Bender electric guitar, acoustic guitar solos, backing vocals

Charts

References

1973 singles
1993 singles
Eagles (band) songs
Alan Jackson songs
Songs about alcohol
Songs written by Glenn Frey
Songs written by Don Henley
Song recordings produced by Glyn Johns
Asylum Records singles
1973 songs